The Australian and New Zealand Journal of Criminology is a triannual peer-reviewed academic journal that covers criminological research. The journal was established in 1968 and is the principal journal of the Australian and New Zealand Society of Criminology.

Abstracting and indexing 
The Australian and New Zealand Journal of Criminology is abstracted and indexed in Scopus and the Social Sciences Citation Index. According to the Journal Citation Reports, its 2013 impact factor is 0.651, ranking it 35th out of 52 journals in the category "Criminology and Penology".

References

External links
 
 Australian and New Zealand Society of Criminology

Publications established in 1968
SAGE Publishing academic journals
English-language journals
Triannual journals
Criminology journals
Crime in Australia